Rhiwallon ap Cynfyn was an 11th-century Welsh King and co-ruler of the kingdoms of Gwynedd and Powys from 1063 to 1070. The son of Cynfyn ap Gwerstan and brother of King Bleddyn of Powys. Through his mother Angharad, he was half-brother to King Gruffydd ap Llywelyn as well. Following the 1063 invasion of Wales by Harold and Tostig Godwinson that overthrew Gruffydd, Rhiwallon and Bleddyn jointly received Powys and Gwynedd on condition of faithfully serving Edward the Confessor "everywhere by water and by land".

In August 1067, Rhiwallon and Bleddyn joined Eadric the Wild in an attack upon Herefordshire as part of the Saxon resistance to the recent Norman Conquest of England. In 1070, the two brothers fought in the Battle of Mechain against Gruffydd's sons Maredudd and Idwal. Though victorious, Rhiwallon was slain in battle and left Bleddyn sole prince of North Wales.

Children
 Gwladys, who married Rhys ap Tewdwr

See also
Kingdom of Gwynedd
Kingdom of Powys
Kings of Wales family trees

Notes

11th-century Welsh monarchs
1020 births

1070 deaths
Year of birth uncertain
Year of death uncertain